The year 2018 is the 8th year in the history of the ONE Championship, a mixed martial arts, kickboxing and muay thai promotion based in Singapore.

List of events

ONE Championship: Kings of Courage

ONE Championship: Kings of Courage (also known as ONE Championship 64) was a mixed martial arts event held by ONE Championship on January 20, 2018 at the Jakarta Convention Center, in Jakarta, Indonesia.

Results
{| class="wikitable" style="font-size: 80%;"
|-
! colspan="8" style="background-color: #ccf; color: #000080; text-align: center;" | Fight Card
|-
! colspan="1" style="background-color: #E6E8FA; color: #000000; text-align: center;" | Weight Class
! colspan="1" style="background-color: #E6E8FA; color: #000000; text-align: center;" | 
! colspan="1" style="background-color: #E6E8FA; color: #000000; text-align: center;" | 
! colspan="1" style="background-color: #E6E8FA; color: #000000; text-align: center;" | 
! colspan="1" style="background-color: #E6E8FA; color: #000000; text-align: center;" | Method
! colspan="1" style="background-color: #E6E8FA; color: #000000; text-align: center;" | Round
! colspan="1" style="background-color: #E6E8FA; color: #000000; text-align: center;" | Time
! colspan="1" style="background-color: #E6E8FA; color: #000000; text-align: center;" | Notes
|-
|Women's Strawweight 57 kg
| Xiong Jing Nan 
|align=center|def.
| Tiffany Teo
|KO/TKO
|align=center|4
|align=center|2:17
|For the inaugural ONE Women's Strawweight Championship
|-
|-
|Flyweight 61 kg
| Stefer Rahardian
|align=center|def.
| Muhammad Imran
|Decision (unanimous)
|align=center|3
|align=center|5:00
|
|-
|-
|Featherweight 70 kg
| Sunoto Penringkat
|align=center|def.
| Rin Saroth
|Submission (keylock)
|align=center|2
|align=center|2:07
|
|-
|-
|Lightweight 77 kg
| Timofey Nastyukhin
|align=center|def.
| Amir Khan
|Decision (unanimous)
|align=center|3
|align=center|5:00
|
|-
|-
|Bantamweight 66 kg
| Yusup Saadulaev
|align=center|def.
| Masakazu Imanari 
|Decision (unanimous)
|align=center|3
|align=center|5:00
|
|-
|-
|Featherweight 70 kg
| Victorio Senduk
|align=center|def.
| Yohan Mulia Legowo
|KO/TKO
|align=center|2
|align=center|0:57 
| 
|-
|-
|Flyweight 61 kg
| Riski Umar
|align=center|def.
| Egi Rozten
|KO/TKO
|align=center|1
|align=center|4:20
|
|-
|-
|Flyweight 61 kg
| Rene Catalan
|align=center|def.
| Peng Xuewen 
|KO/TKO (punches)
|align=center|2
|align=center|4:22
|
|-
|-
|Women Strawweight 57 kg
| Priscilla Gaol 
|align=center|def.
| Audreylaura Boniface
|KO/TKO (punches)
|align=center|1
|align=center|3:23
|
|-

ONE Championship: Global Superheroes

ONE Championship: Global Superheroes (also known as ONE Championship 65) was a mixed martial arts event held by ONE Championship on January 26, 2018 at the Mall of Asia Arena, in Manila, Philippines.

Results 
{| class="wikitable" style="font-size: 80%;"
|-
! colspan="8" style="background-color: #ccf; color: #000080; text-align: center;" | Fight Card
|-
! colspan="1" style="background-color: #E6E8FA; color: #000000; text-align: center;" | Weight Class
! colspan="1" style="background-color: #E6E8FA; color: #000000; text-align: center;" | 
! colspan="1" style="background-color: #E6E8FA; color: #000000; text-align: center;" | 
! colspan="1" style="background-color: #E6E8FA; color: #000000; text-align: center;" | 
! colspan="1" style="background-color: #E6E8FA; color: #000000; text-align: center;" | Method
! colspan="1" style="background-color: #E6E8FA; color: #000000; text-align: center;" | Round
! colspan="1" style="background-color: #E6E8FA; color: #000000; text-align: center;" | Time
! colspan="1" style="background-color: #E6E8FA; color: #000000; text-align: center;" | Notes
|-
|Flyweight 61 kg 
| Geje Eustaquio
|def.
| Kairat Akhmetov
|Decision (unanimous)
|5
|5:00
|For the Interim ONE Flyweight Championship
|-
|Strawweight 57 kg
| Joshua Pacio
|def.
| Lan Ming Qiang
|Submission (rear-naked choke)
|1
|4:01
|
|-

ONE Championship: Quest for Gold

ONE Championship: Quest for Gold (also known as ONE Championship 66) was a mixed martial arts event held by ONE Championship on February 23, 2018 at the Thuwunna Indoor Stadium, in Yangon, Myanmar.

Results 
{| class="wikitable" style="font-size: 80%;"
|-
! colspan="8" style="background-color: #ccf; color: #000080; text-align: center;" | Fight Card
|-
! colspan="1" style="background-color: #E6E8FA; color: #000000; text-align: center;" | Weight Class
! colspan="1" style="background-color: #E6E8FA; color: #000000; text-align: center;" | 
! colspan="1" style="background-color: #E6E8FA; color: #000000; text-align: center;" | 
! colspan="1" style="background-color: #E6E8FA; color: #000000; text-align: center;" | 
! colspan="1" style="background-color: #E6E8FA; color: #000000; text-align: center;" | Method
! colspan="1" style="background-color: #E6E8FA; color: #000000; text-align: center;" | Round
! colspan="1" style="background-color: #E6E8FA; color: #000000; text-align: center;" | Time
! colspan="1" style="background-color: #E6E8FA; color: #000000; text-align: center;" | Notes
|-
|Cruiserweight 102 kg
| Aung La Nsang
|align=center|def.
| Alexandre Machado
|TKO (head kick and punches)
|align=center|1
|align=center|0:56
|For the vacant ONE Cruiserweight Championship
|-
|-
|Lightweight 77 kg
| Ev Ting
|align=center|def.
| Ariel Sexton
|Decision (split)
|align=center|3
|align=center|5:00
|
|-
|-
|Featherweight 70 kg
| Phoe Thaw
|align=center|def.
| Sor Sey
|KO (head kick)
|align=center|1
|align=center|1:53
|
|-
|-
|Lightweight 77 kg
| Timofey Nastyukhin
|align=center|def.
| Amir Khan
|Decision (unanimous)
|align=center|3
|align=center|5:00
|
|-
|-
|Bantamweight 66 kg
| Daichi Takenaka
|align=center|def.
| Dae Hwan Kim
|DQ (illegal strike)
|align=center|1
|align=center|3:06
|
|-
|-
|Flyweight 61 kg
| Ye Thway Ne
|align=center|def.
| Saw Min Min
|Decision (split)
|align=center|3
|align=center|5:00
| Lethwei fight
|-
|-
|Featherweight 70 kg
| Kai Wen Li
|align=center|def.
| Roel Rosauro
|Submission (guillotine choke)
|align=center|1
|align=center|0:43
|
|-
|-
|Women Atomweight 52 kg
| Priscilla Hertati Lumban Gaol
|align=center|def.
| Krisna Limbaga
|Submission (arm triangle choke)
|align=center|1
|align=center|4:05
|
|-
|-
|Women Atomweight 52 kg
| Bozhena Antoniyar
|align=center|def.
| Shwe Sin
|TKO (punches)
|align=center|1
|align=center|0:24
|
|-

ONE Championship: Visions of Victory

ONE Championship: Visions of Victory (also known as ONE Championship 67) was a mixed martial arts event held by ONE Championship on March 9, 2018 at the Axiata Arena, in Kuala Lumpur, Malaysia.

Results

ONE Championship: Iron Will

ONE Championship: Iron Will (also known as ONE Championship 68) was a mixed martial arts event held by ONE Championship on March 24, 2018 at the Impact Arena, in Bangkok, Thailand.

Results

ONE Warrior Series 1

ONE Warrior Series 1 was a mixed martial arts event held by ONE Championship on March 31, 2018 in Singapore.

Background
The event was the first in a series that was organized to complement Rich Franklin’s One Warrior Series, a show featuring the ONE Championship Vice President and former UFC middleweight champion, which was created to discover fresh young talent.

Rockie Bactol, Kim Woon Kyoom, and Dae Sung Park were announced as the first winners of $100,000+ ONE Championship contracts as overall winners of the reality documentary series at the conclusion of the fight card.

Results

ONE Championship: Heroes of Honor

ONE Championship: Heroes of Honor (also known as ONE Championship 69) was a mixed martial arts event held by ONE Championship on April 20, 2018 at the Mall of Asia Arena, in Manila, Philippines.

Results

ONE Championship: Grit and Glory

ONE Championship: Grit and Glory (also known as ONE Championship 70) was a mixed martial arts event held by ONE Championship on May 12, 2018 at the Jakarta Convention Center, in Jakarta, Indonesia.

Results

ONE Championship: Unstoppable Dreams

ONE Championship: Unstoppable Dreams (also known as ONE Championship 71) was a mixed martial arts event held by ONE Championship on May 18, 2018 at the Singapore Indoor Stadium in Kallang, Singapore.

Background 
This event featured three title fights first a ONE Women's Atomweight Championship bout between the champion Angela Lee and top contender Mei Yamaguchi to serve as the event headliner, secondly a bout for the inaugural ONE Muay Thai Flyweight Championship between Sam-A Kaiyanghadaogym and Sergio Wielzen as co-headliner and finally a bout for the ONE Featherweight Championship, Martin Nguyen makes the first defense of his title against top contender Christian Lee.

Results

ONE Championship: Battle for the Heavens (Cancelled)

The event was cancelled.

ONE Championship: Pinnacle of Power

ONE Championship: Pinnacle of Power (also known as ONE Championship 72) was a mixed martial arts event held by ONE Championship on June 23, 2018 at the Olympic Sports Center in Beijing, China.

Background 
This event featured a two title fights first a ONE Flyweight Championship unification bout between two-time champion Adriano Moraes and interim champion Geje Eustaquio to serve as the event headliner, and a bout for the ONE Women's Strawweight Championship between Jingnan Xiong and Laura Balin as co-headliner.

Results

ONE Warrior Series 2

ONE Warrior Series 2 was a mixed martial arts event held by ONE Championship on October 11, 2018 in Singapore.

Results

ONE Championship: Spirit Of A Warrior

ONE Championship: Spirit Of A Warrior (also known as ONE Championship 73) was a mixed martial arts event held by ONE Championship on June 29, 2018 at the Thuwunna Indoor Stadium in Yangon, Myanmar.

Background 
This event featured a world title fight for the ONE Middleweight Championship, Aung La Nsang of Myanmar makes the first defense of his title against top contender Ken Hasegawa of Japan as ONE Championship: Spirit Of A Warrior headliner.

The co-main event featured a Bantamweight bout between top contender Leandro Issa and Roman Alvarez.

The result of the fight between Sagetdao Petpayathai and Jia Wen Ma was originally a decision win for Petpayathai; ONE FC Competition Committee officially reversed the decision after review Jia Wen Ma is now the winner.

Results

ONE Championship: Battle for the Heavens

ONE Championship: Battle for the Heavens  (also known as ONE Championship 74) was a mixed martial arts event held by ONE Championship on July 7, 2018 at the Tianhe Gymnasium in Guangzhou, China.

Background 
This event featured a world title fight for the inaugural ONE Kickboxing Women's Atomweight Championship between Yodcherry Sityodtong of Thailand against Kai Ting Chuang of China as ONE Championship: Battle for the Heavens headliner.

Results

ONE Championship: Pursuit of Power

ONE Championship: Pursuit of Power (also known as ONE Championship 75) was a mixed martial arts event held by ONE Championship on July 13, 2018 at the Axiata Arena in Kuala Lumpur, Malaysia.

Background 
This event featured a Superfight between top contender from Sweden Zebaztian Kadestam and Agilan Thani of Malaysia as ONE Championship: Pursuit of Power headliner.

The co-main event featured a Featherweight Muay Thai bout between top contender Jo Nattawut and Yohann Drai.

Results

ONE Championship: Reign of Kings

ONE Championship: Reign of Kings (also known as ONE Championship 76) will be a mixed martial arts event held by ONE Championship on July 27, 2018 at the Mall of Asia Arena in Manila, Philippines.

Background 
This event featured a world title fight for the interim ONE Bantamweight Championship, Filipino top contender Kevin Belingon take on the ONE Championship Featherweight and Lightweight champion Martin Nguyen as ONE Championship: Reign of Kings headliner.

The co-main event featured a Lightweight bout between top contender Shinya Aoki and Shannon Wiratchai.

Results

ONE Championship: Beyond The Horizon

ONE Championship: Beyond The Horizon (also known as ONE Championship 77) was a mixed martial arts event held by ONE Championship on September 8, 2018 at the Baoshan Arena in Shanghai, China.

Background 
Roman Alvarez had to withdraw due to an injury and is not able to fight against Daichi Takenaka, the bout was canceled.

Results

ONE Championship: Conquest of Heroes

ONE Championship: Conquest of Heroes (also known as ONE Championship 78) was a mixed martial arts event held by ONE Championship on September 22, 2018 at the Jakarta Convention Center in Jakarta, Indonesia.

Background

Results

ONE Championship: Kingdom of Heroes

ONE Championship: Kingdom of Heroes (also known as ONE Championship 79) was a mixed martial arts event held by ONE Championship on October 6, 2018 at the Impact Arena in Bangkok, Thailand.

Background 
This event featured a two title fights first a boxing match for the WBC Super Flyweight Boxing Championship between the champion Srisaket Sor Rungvisai and Iran Diaz to serve as the event headliner, and a bout for the ONE Kickboxing Women's Atomweight Championship between Kai Ting Zhuang and Stamp Fairtex as co-headliner.

Results

ONE Warrior Series 3

ONE Warrior Series 3 was a mixed martial arts event held by ONE Championship on October 11, 2018 in Singapore.

Results

ONE Championship: Pursuit of Greatness

ONE Championship: Pursuit of Greatness (also known as ONE Championship 80) was a mixed martial arts event held by ONE Championship on October 26, 2018 at the Thuwunna Indoor Stadium in Yangon, Myanmar.

Background 
This event featured a world title fight for the ONE Middleweight Championship, Lebanese top contender Mohammad Karaki take on the ONE Championship Middleweight and Light Heavyweight champion Aung La Nsang as ONE Championship: Pursuit of Greatness headliner.

Results

ONE Championship: Heart of the Lion

ONE Championship: Heart of the Lion (also known as ONE Championship 81) was a mixed martial arts event held by ONE Championship on November 9, 2018 at the Singapore Indoor Stadium in Kallang, Singapore.

Background 
This event featured a world title fight for the ONE Bantamweight Championship title unification, the interim champion Kevin Belingon take on the ONE Championship Bantamweight champion Bibiano Fernandes as ONE Championship: Pursuit of Greatness headliner.

Angela Lee was expected to face reigning flyweight champion Jingnan Xiong at ONE Championship: Heart of the Lion in an attempt to become the first female two-division champion in ONE Championship. However, on November 5, 2018, Lee revealed that she was forced off the card due to a back injury.

Results

ONE Championship: Warrior's Dream

ONE Championship: Warrior's Dream (also known as ONE Championship 82) was a mixed martial arts event held by ONE Championship on November 17, 2018 at the Stadium Istora in Jakarta, Indonesia.

Background 
This event featured a world title fight for the vacant ONE Welterweight Championship, Swede top contender Zebaztian Kadestam take on the American Tyler McGuire as ONE Championship: Warrior's Dream headliner.

The co-main event featured the debut of former Glory Welterweight Champion Nieky Holzken in a catchweight bout against Cosmo Alexandre.

Results

ONE Championship: Conquest of Champions

ONE Championship: Conquest of Champions (also known as ONE Championship 83) was a mixed martial arts event held by ONE Championship on November 23, 2018 at the Mall of Asia Arena in Pasay, Philippines.

Background 
This event featured two title fights, first the highly anticipated return of ONE Championship Heavyweight champion Brandon Vera, who returned from a two-year hiatus to face Mauro Cerilli for the ONE Heavyweight Championship as the event headliner. And a bout for the vacant ONE Lightweight Championship between the former champ Eduard Folayang and top contender Amir Khan as co-headliner.

Fight Card

ONE Championship: Destiny of Champions

ONE Championship: Destiny of Champions (also known as ONE Championship 84) was a mixed martial arts event held by ONE Championship on December 7, 2018 at the Axiata Arena in Kuala Lumpur, Malaysia.

Background 
Charlie Peters was scheduled to face Phetmorakot Wor Sangprapai, but Peters was forced off the card on November 29 he suffered a slipped disk injury during his training. Fellow Englishman Liam Harrison served as Peters replacement.

Results

See also
2018 in UFC 
Bellator MMA in 2018
2018 in Rizin Fighting Federation 
2018 in Absolute Championship Berkut 
2018 in M-1 Global 
2018 in Konfrontacja Sztuk Walki 
2018 in Road FC 
2018 in Glory
2018 in Glory of Heroes
2018 in Kunlun Fight
2018 in K-1  
2018 in Romanian kickboxing

References

External links
ONE Championship

ONE Championship events
ONE Championship events
2018 in mixed martial arts
2018 in kickboxing
2018 sport-related lists